In mathematics, specifically group theory, isoclinism is an equivalence relation on groups which generalizes isomorphism. The word "isoclinism" comes from the Greek ισοκλινης meaning equal slope. 

Definition

The isoclinism class of a group G is determined by the groups G/Z(G) (the inner automorphism group) and G′ (the  commutator subgroup) and the commutator map from G/Z(G) × G/Z(G) to G′ (taking a, b to aba−1b−1). 

In other words,  two groups G1 and G2 are isoclinic if there are isomorphisms from  G1/Z(G1) to G2/Z(G2) and from G1′ to G2′ commuting with the commutator map.

Examples
All Abelian groups are isoclinic since they are equal to their centers and their commutator subgroups are always the identity subgroup.  Indeed, a group is isoclinic to an abelian group if and only if it is itself abelian, and G is isoclinic with G×A if and only if A is abelian.  The dihedral, quasidihedral, and quaternion groups of order 2n are isoclinic for n≥3,  in more detail.

Isoclinism divides p-groups into families, and the smallest members of each family are called stem groups. A group is a stem group if and only if Z(G) ≤ [G,G], that is, if and only if every element of the center of the group is contained in the derived subgroup (also called the commutator subgroup), .

This is used in describing the character tables of the finite simple groups .

References 
 

 

Finite groups